Miss Indonesia 2022, was the 17th edition of the Miss Indonesia pageant, held on 15 September 2022 at RCTI+ Studio in Jakarta, Indonesia. Pricilia Carla Yules of South Sulawesi crowned Audrey Vanessa Susilo of North Sulawesi as her successor at the end of the event. Audrey will represent Indonesia at Miss World 2023.

The finale was attended by Miss World 2021, Karolina Bielawska of Poland.

Background

Location and date 

Miss Indonesia 2022 was held at RCTI+ Studio in Jakarta on 15 September 2022 after cancelling the 2021 edition due to the COVID-19 pandemic. It was the first edition of the pageant to be held in the second half of a year.

Selection of participants 

All contestants were chosen through an online audition that was held for five months starting from January to June 2022. Instead of the usual 34, there were 37 contestants competing for the title. Three new provinces of Indonesia made its debut at the pageant this year. They were Central Papua, Highland Papua, and South Papua. As a result, this is the biggest turnout for Miss Indonesia to date.

Results

Main

§ Entered the Top 15 by winning fast track

Fast track events
The winner of the fast track events automatically entered the Top 15 on the final night.

Special awards

Contestants 
37 contestants competed for the title. Each province had one representative.

Notes

References 

2022 beauty pageants
Miss Indonesia